Megasyrphus is a genus of hoverflies in the subfamily Syrphinae. It was formally a subgenus of Eriozona.

Species
Megasyrphus alashayicus (Peck, 1974)
Megasyrphus catalina (Curran, 1830)
Megasyrphus chinensis  (Ho, 1987)
Megasyrphus erraticus (Linnaeus, 1758)
Megasyrphus laxus (Osten Sacken, 1875)

References

Diptera of Europe
Syrphinae
Syrphini
Hoverfly genera